"Apprends-Moi" (Teach Me) is a song performed by Belgian singer of Italian origin Roberto Bellarosa, released as the third single from his debut studio album Ma voie (2012). It was released on October 26, 2012 as a digital download in Belgium on iTunes. The song was written by Han Kooreneef, Christal G and produced by Tiery-F.

Track listing

Credits and personnel
 Lead vocals – Roberto Bellarosa
 Producers – Tiery-F
 Lyrics – Han Kooreneef, Christal G
 Label – SME Belgium NV, 8ball Music

Chart performance

Release history

References

2012 singles
Roberto Bellarosa songs
2012 songs
Sony Music singles